Deadguy is an American metalcore band from New Brunswick, New Jersey. The band formed in 1994 and disbanded in 1997. Deadguy is considered to have played an important role in the development of the mathcore genre, their sole studio album Fixation on a Co-Worker being cited as a classic within the genre by some. In 2006, Decibel magazine included the album in its "Hall of Fame" list.

History
Formed in 1994, Deadguy took inspiration from bands like Unsane and Today is the Day. The band took their name from a line in the John Candy movie, Only the Lonely. The group issued two 7-inch extended plays that year alone: Work Ethic and White Meat. Although not as widely known as some of their peers, Deadguy has proven to be very influential on modern hardcore and metal as evidenced by their only proper studio album, Fixation On A Co-Worker being inducted into the Decibel magazine Hall of Fame in July 2006.

The band embarked on a fateful US tour in support of Fixation on a Co-Worker that was plagued by misguided booking and lack of funds. The band splintered during the western leg of the tour as Keith Huckins and Tim Singer left the band and moved to Seattle, Washington to form Kiss It Goodbye. The remaining members (Tim Naumann, Chris Corvino and Dave Rosenberg) then recruited Tom Yak and Jim Baglino (on second guitar and bass respectively). After the line-up changes, Deadguy wrote and recorded  Screamin' with the Deadguy Quintet.  A US tour with Bloodlet ensued in support of the EP. The tour was gruelling but successful and Tom Yak left the band shortly thereafter, and the rest of Deadguy recruited Doc Hopper member Chris Pierce to replace him. They played their last show in New Brunswick, NJ in 1997. Pierce later ran a recording studio in New Brunswick called Technical Ecstacy which recorded many locally renowned acts such as The Ergs and used his old Deadguy connections to get "Pops" to do guest vocals on their song "Maybe I'm The New Messiah" while recording their benchmark album "Dorkrockcorkrod".

2021 Reunion
On May 25th, 2021, Deadguy announced they would reunite the "Fixation on a Co-worker" lineup and play the 2021 Decibel Metal and Beer Fest. It was their first show in 25 years. This live performance was subsequently released as Buyer's Remorse: Live from the Decibel Magazine Metal & Beer Fest in June 2022 by Decibel Records, as the label's first release.

Members

Final line-up
 Chris "Crispy" Corvino - guitars, backing vocals (1994-1997, 2021-present)
 Dave Rosenberg - drums (1994-1997, 2021-present)
 Tim "Pops" Naumann - lead vocals (1996-1997), bass (1994-1996)
 Jim Baglino - bass (1996-1997, 2021-present)
 “Big” Chris Pierce - guitars (1997)

Previous members
 Tim "Swinger" Singer - lead vocals (1994-1996, 2021-present)
 Keith Huckins - guitars (1994-1996, 2021-present)
 Tom Yak - guitars (1996-1997)

Timeline

Discography

Studio albums
 Fixation on a Co-Worker (Victory Records, 1995)

Live albums
 I Know Your Tragedy: Live at CBGBs (Hawthorne Street Records, 2000)
 Buyer's Remorse (Decibel Records, 2022)

EPs and singles
 White Meat 7" (Dada/Popgun Records, 1994)
 Work Ethic 7" (Engine/Blackout Records, 1994) (CD edition, featuring White Meat tracks, released in 1995)
 Screamin' with the Deadguy Quintet (Victory Records, 1996)
 Body Parts 7" (Man Alive Records, 2022)

Other
 Driving You Straight To Hell Bootleg (SuperNova Records, 2021)

Documentary
In 2021, a documentary titled Deadguy: Killing Music was released by director William Saunders and producer Nathaniel Shannon of Fourth Media. It is the first authorized documentary on the band's short-lived career and their seminal album, Fixation on a Co-Worker. The feature was an official selection at several film festivals and winner of the 2021 Vesuvius International Film Festival's Documentary Film category. Through the series of interviews and events in the creation of the film, the band members reconnected. The day after the film's premiere at Underground Arts in Philadelphia, PA, the original band members performed together live for the first time in over 20 years. Another 2021 performance, at Saint Vitus in Brooklyn, NY, was recorded and included in the on-demand streaming and blu-ray versions of the film. Shawn Macomber of Decibel describes Deadguy: Killing Music as "Wry and stylish on the surface while reveling in primal vitriol and unorthodox approaches to violence just below" and "one of the best documentaries ever, period, on extreme music, the combustible nature of the youth drawn to create it, and the subsequent better-to-have-a-full-core-nuclear-meltdown-than-fade-away art."

Notes

External links
Deadguy on Discogs 
Deadguy on Encyclopaedia Metallum

Musical groups established in 1994
Musical groups disestablished in 1997
Musical groups reestablished in 2021
Metalcore musical groups from New Jersey
Hardcore punk groups from New Jersey
Musical groups from New Jersey
Victory Records artists
1994 establishments in New Jersey